António Ribeiro dos Reis (19 July 1896 – 1961) was a Portuguese footballer and journalist.

Career

Playing career
Born in Lisbon, Ribeiro dos Reis played for Benfica between 1914 and 1925. He also represented Portugal national team in 1921, and managed his nation between 1921 and 1923, and 1925 and 1926. The Taça Ribeiro dos Reis, held between 1961 and 1971, was named after him.

Journalism
Ribeiro dos Reis, along with Cândido de Oliveira, co-founded  sports newspaper A Bola in 1945.

Further reading

External links 
 

1896 births
1961 deaths
Footballers from Lisbon
Portuguese footballers
Portugal international footballers
Portuguese football managers
Portuguese journalists
Male journalists
Portugal national football team managers
Association footballers not categorized by position
20th-century journalists